Hieracium reticulatum is a species of flowering plant belonging to the family Asteraceae.

Its native range is Scandinavia and northwestern European Russia.

References

reticulatum
Flora of Norway
Flora of Sweden
Flora of Finland
Flora of Northwest European Russia
Plants described in 1878